The East Plano Islamic Center (EPIC) is a mosque located in Plano, Texas. The current building of the masjid opened in July 2015, although the mosque started a decade earlier. The current Imam is Nadim Bashir, and the current resident scholar is Yasir Qadhi. The mosque is one of many mosques in the Dallas-Fort Worth area.

EPIC is a non-profit tax-exempt organization (with Tax-ID: 20–0629612) that has been formed exclusively for educational, religious, and social purposes. It is registered with the Internal Revenue Service under revenue code 501(c)(3).

EPIC is a multi-ethnic, multi-racial, multi-lingual, non-sectarian, diverse, and open community committed to full and equal participation and involvement of men and women who are community members of EPIC and subscribe to accept its rules, regulations, and procedures. EPIC is committed to civic and civil engagement with communities of other faiths and society at large. The core of the community is largely made up by the South Asian diaspora, especially Pakistani Americans, as is the case with most masjids in the Dallas–Fort Worth area.

The community is categorized by multimillion-dollar homes next to the masjid, with an average household income of $180,271 and a per capita income of $91,550 for males and $88,721 for females, a golf course, high end shops and luxurious gyms nearby a great standard of living, and is home to a large number of doctors, nurses, engineers, lawyers and IT professionals. The large donations of this wealthy community is what enables EPIC to be one of the leading centers for Islam in North America.

History
EPIC started with small gatherings in people's garages in 2003 and became a non-profit later that year. The founders would meet up in the Islamic Association of North Texas and would plan its future. After a location in a trailer followed by a location in a strip mall, EPIC moved to a building of about 10,000 square feet in 2008. It moved into a much larger, newer facility in 2015. The mosque had its first funeral service in June 2016, for a high school student who grew up going to EPIC.
In May 2021 during the Israeli-Gaza crisis EPIC spoke out on the issue and on Jun 5th 2021 they brought famous author Miko Peled to speak in support of Palestine. Peled's grandfather, Avraham Katsnelson, signed Israel's Declaration of Independence. His father, Mattityahu Peled, served as a general in the Six-Day War of 1967.

COVID-19
During the COVID-19 pandemic, EPIC masjid was cautious about reopening in full due its large population of doctors and specialists who saw the pandemic effects first hand. EPIC masjid was the last to open all prayer areas from March 13, 2020, to April 9, 2021, although the main Musalla was closed during that time. It had even more restrictions in Ramadan 2021. It had the least restrictions of any masjid during Eid-ul-Adha of 2020 with prayers in the gym area with limited capacity.
One year later, for Ramadan 2022, all COVID restrictions were gone, including mask mandates. 

During 2021 Ramadan, the masjid was able to raise close to a million dollars (~$814,500) during its fundraising night.

EPIC-Waqf 

On October 3, 2021, EPIC announced the EPIC waqf is starting at $3.6 million on the EPIC Waqf fundraiser night they raised $2,420,500 EPIC owns a retail space worth $1 million and another empty plot of land at 4W Campbell Rd & N President George Bush Hwy, Garland, TX 75044

As part of EPIC mission 2025 a expansion is planned for the masjid it will include a food pantry, wedding/event hall and a coffee shop.

Demographics 
The EPIC masjid community is majority South Asian with a significant Arab minority, while others make up 7.3% of the masjid population. This South Asian majority is also seen in the faculty and board. Representing the Arab community are Ustadh Morad Awad (youth director) and Ustadh Mohamad Baajour (director of education/tarbiyah). The South Asian community is represented by world famous resident scholar Yasir Qadhi, Sheikh Sajjad Gul Hifz (school principal), and Imam Nadim Bashir (Imam of EPIC).

See also
 List of mosques in the Americas
 Lists of mosques
 List of mosques in the United States

References

Mosques in Texas
Buildings and structures in Plano, Texas
Mosques completed in 2015